The Mongol Messenger is the first English-language newspaper published from Mongolia. It was launched by the Mongolian news agency Montsame. It is a  Government owned newspaper.

References

External links
The Mongol Messenger
Montsame News Agency

English-language newspapers published in Asia
Newspapers published in Mongolia
Publications with year of establishment missing